The term Greek legislative election, 1915 may refer to:

 Greek legislative election, May 1915
 Greek legislative election, December 1915